This is a list of print newspapers in Wisconsin.  There were 362 newspapers in Wisconsin at the beginning of 2020.This is a list of daily newspapers currently published in Wisconsin. For weekly newspapers, see List of newspapers in Wisconsin.

Daily and nondaily newspapers

<noinclude>

References

External links
 . (Survey of local news existence and ownership in 21st century)

Wisconsin
 
Newspapers